Monkey Brand soap was introduced in the 1880s in cake/bar form in the United States and United Kingdom as a household scouring and polishing soap.

History 
Initially, Benjamin Brooke & Co Ltd, a firm owned by Sidney and Henry Gross, had produced the soap in Philadelphia. The soap's highly abrasive agent was probably pumice.

Lever Brothers bought the company in January 1899 and transferred the production of Monkey Brand soap to Port Sunlight near Liverpool. The name ‘Benjamin Brooke’ (hence Brooke's Monkey Brand) was retained to promote the Monkey Brand soap on both sides of the Atlantic.

In George Bernard Shaw's Pygmalion and the musical based on it (My Fair Lady), Henry Higgins tells his housekeeper to take Eliza Doolittle upstairs and clean her up, and to use "...Monkey Brand, if it won't come off any other way" (Act II). In the movie version, the line is changed to "...sandpaper, if it won't come off any other way." In Beatrix Potter's 1912 novel The Tale of Mr Tod, Mr Tod mentioned Monkey Soap as one of the soaps needed for cleaning his bedding.

The advertising campaign for Monkey Brand soap was used by cultural historians for analyzing Victorian values and social attitudes at the intersection of race, gender and class.

See also
 List of cleaning products

References

Further reading

External links
 * Advert For Brooke's Monkey Brand Soap, The British Library
 History of Benjamin Brooke & Company
 Phil Beard, Monkey Wash, Donkey Rinse, May 22, 2008 

Cleaning products